Dawn Holden (born 1 September 1980) is an English former cricketer who played as a slow left-arm orthodox bowler and right-handed batter. She played 3 Test matches and 32 One Day Internationals for England between 1999 and 2004. She played domestic cricket for East Midlands, Nottinghamshire, Western Australia and Queensland.

References

External links
 

1980 births
Living people
England women Test cricketers
England women One Day International cricketers
East Midlands women cricketers
Nottinghamshire women cricketers
Western Australia women cricketers
Queensland Fire cricketers